The Iran Football award Winners is an annual association football award presented to Best Player, Coach and Referees in Iran, which recognises the most outstanding player in the Persian Gulf Pro League each season. The recipient is chosen by a panel assembled by the association football.

IRIFF awards

This award is organized by Iran football federation and includes the best Iranian footballers in each field. Mehdi Taremi  and Moharram Navidkia have been Player of the Season on two occasions each and are the only players to have won the award more than once.with Taremi having achieved this in consecutive years (2015 and 2016).

Persepolis and Iran national football team goalkeeper Alireza Beiranvand won two awards at the 2018-19 Iran Professional League (IPL) season. Beiranvand won IPL Man of the Year award and was also honored as the best goalkeeper of the season.

Manager of the year

Young player of the year

Top assister of the year

Goalkeeper of the year

Defender of the year

Midfielder of the year

Striker of the year

Foreign player of the year

Referee of the year

References

External links

Football people in Iran
Iranian football trophies and awards